Hebius taronensis the Kachin keelback, is a species of snake of the family Colubridae. The snake is found in Myanmar and India.

References 

taronensis
Reptiles described in 1940
Reptiles of Myanmar
Reptiles of India
Taxa named by Malcolm Arthur Smith